Poesia de Cabo Verde e Sete Poemas de Sebastião da Gama (Poetry of Cape Verde and Seven Poems by Sebastião da Gama) is a collection of poems released in a CD by Afonso Dias and other "guests" (Carlos Germano, Luís Vicente, Mina Andala and Paulo Moreira), it was edited as part of Associação Música XXI (XXI (21st) Music Association) in Faro, Portugal in June 2007.

Poems

The Cape Verdean poems represented in the CD, in the order of appearance are:

See also
Literature of Cape Verde

References

External links
Associação Música XXI (XXI Music Association) of Faro, Portugal 

Cape Verdean literature